Yasser Sibai (born 6 February 1972) is a Syrian football defender who played for Syria in the 1996 Asian Cup.

Achievements
As a manager, Sibai won the double (Syrian League and Syrian Cup) with Al-Ittihad in 2005.

External links
 
 
 11v11.com

1972 births
Living people
Syrian footballers
Al-Ittihad Aleppo players
Al-Jaish Damascus players
Safa SC players
Syrian football managers
Expatriate football managers in Qatar
Al Kharaitiyat SC managers
Place of birth missing (living people)
Association football defenders
Syrian expatriate sportspeople in Lebanon
Syrian expatriate footballers
Expatriate footballers in Lebanon
Syrian Premier League players